Joaquim Ricardo Soares Silva (born 19 March 1992) is a Portuguese cyclist, who currently rides for UCI Continental team .

Major results

2014
 1st  Road race, National Under-23 Road Championships
 2nd Overall Volta a Portugal do Futuro
 8th Overall Tour de l'Avenir
2017
 8th Overall Vuelta a Castilla y León
 9th Overall Vuelta a Asturias
2018
 7th Overall GP Beiras e Serra da Estrela
 8th Overall Vuelta a Asturias
2019
 7th Overall Tour of Qinghai Lake
 10th Overall Tour de Luxembourg
2021
 7th Overall Trofeu Joaquim Agostinho  
 8th Overall Volta ao Alentejo 
2022
 9th Overall Vuelta a Asturias
 9th Overall Volta ao Alentejo
2023
 9th Overall O Gran Camiño

References

External links

1992 births
Living people
Portuguese male cyclists
People from Penafiel
Sportspeople from Porto District